Epipole may refer to:

 Epipole of Carystus, a woman participant in the Trojan War.
 In Greek mythology, an epithet of Demeter at Lacedaemon. (Hesychius s. v. Epipolla.)
 The image points in epipolar geometry.

Epithets of Demeter